Rhys Anstey is a Welsh rugby union player, currently playing for United Rugby Championship side Cardiff. His preferred position is lock.

Cardiff
Anstey was named in the Cardiff academy squad for the 2021–22 season. He made his debut for Cardiff in the first round of the 2021–22 European Rugby Champions Cup against  coming on as a replacement.

References

Living people
Welsh rugby union players
Cardiff Rugby players
Rugby union locks
Year of birth missing (living people)